Half Moon Light is the fourth studio album by American band The Lone Bellow. It was released on February 7, 2020 under Dualtone Records.

The first single from the album, "Count on Me" was released on October 23, 2019.

Critical reception
Half Moon Light was met with generally favorable reviews from critics. At Metacritic, which assigns a weighted average rating out of 100 to reviews from mainstream publications, this release received an average score of 72, based on 6 reviews.

Track listing

Charts

References

2020 albums
Dualtone Records albums
The Lone Bellow albums